Calendar Girl is an LP album by Julie London, released by Liberty Records under catalog number SL-9002 in 1956. In keeping with the title, each of the first twelve tracks had a month in its title, completing the album with a song entitled "Thirteenth Month". Two of the songs were composed especially for this album by London's future husband, Bobby Troup, who also produced the album, as he did many of her albums.

Track listing

Selected personnel
Julie London – vocals
Dick Nash - trombone
Buddy Cole - piano
Al Hendrickson - guitar
Red Callender - double bass
Milt Holland - drums
Felix Slatkin - violin
Eleanor Slatkin - cello
Pete King – arranger

Notes

References

Liberty Records albums
1956 albums
Julie London albums
Albums produced by Bobby Troup
Concept albums